Sargodha Cricket Stadium is a cricket stadium located in Sargodha, Punjab, Pakistan. It is primarily used for cricket matches. It was established in 1940 and presently has a seating capacity of 20,000. It hosted its first One Day International in 1992 against Sri Lanka. It is located within the walking distance of the University of Sargodha and part of the Local Sports and Entertainment Precinct.

The stadium had its first game in 1954. The open-air stadium is also famous for its role in the development of local cricket. Many youngsters attend practice sessions in the stadium. Many local events like sports functions by universities, colleges and schools.

Tenants
Sargodha Cricket Stadium is home ground of the Sargodha cricket team that is a first-class cricket team that represents Sargodha Division in Punjab Province in Pakistan. They competed in Pakistan's first-class tournaments between 1961–62 and 2002–03.

Other events 

Sargodha Cricket Stadium has also hosted other events, including a picket by PTI's Chairman, former cricketer and the present Prime Minister of Pakistan, Imran Khan and by some other famous leaders too, and also hosts major musical concerts.

See also
Pakistan Cricket Board
List of Test cricket grounds
 List of stadiums in Pakistan
 List of cricket grounds in Pakistan
 List of sports venues in Karachi
 List of sports venues in Lahore
 List of sports venues in Faisalabad

References

External links
 http://www.espncricinfo.com/pakistan/content/ground/59014.html
 http://pk.wowcity.com/sargodha/gpid/106983942582159948366/sargodha-national-cricket-stad.htm

Sargodha District
Cricket grounds in Pakistan
Stadiums in Pakistan
Sport in Punjab, Pakistan